Herzhorn was an Amt ("collective municipality") in the district of Steinburg, in Schleswig-Holstein, Germany. The seat of the Amt was in Herzhorn. In January 2008, it was merged with the Amt Horst to form the Amt Horst-Herzhorn.

The Amt Herzhorn consisted of the following municipalities:
Blomesche Wildnis 
Borsfleth 
Engelbrechtsche Wildnis 
Herzhorn
Kollmar 
Krempdorf 
Neuendorf bei Elmshorn

Former Ämter in Schleswig-Holstein